Sebucan may refer to:

 Sebucán a neighborhood in Caracas, Venezuela
 Sebucan (dance), a traditional dance from Venezuela
 Leptocereus grantianus, a cactus
 Leptocereus quadricostatus, a cactus
 Tapioca